Mark Everett Keenum (born January 28, 1961) is an agricultural economist who is the 19th university president of Mississippi State University. He served as a professor at Mississippi State University from 1988 to 1989 and 1997 to 2009, congressional staff of U.S. Senator Thad Cochran from 1989 to 2006, and Under Secretary of Agriculture for Farm and Foreign Agricultural Services in the United States Department of Agriculture from 2007 to 2009. He became the chair of Board for International Food and Agricultural Development (BIFAD) since 2018.

Background
Keenum was born in Starkville, Mississippi, on January 28, 1961. He graduated from Corinth High School in Corinth, Mississippi, and was a lineman for the CHS Warriors football team. He also earned an Associate of Arts degree from Northeast Mississippi Community College in Booneville and played on Northeast Tigers football team. He holds a bachelor's degree in agricultural economics (1983), a Master of Science in Agricultural Economics (1984), and a Ph.D in Agricultural Economics (1988) from Mississippi State University.

Career
After completing his bachelor's and master's degrees, Keenum joined the MSU faculty as a marketing specialist with the Mississippi Cooperative Extension Service at Mississippi State University (MSU) in 1984. 

Two years later, he accepted a position as a Research Associate with the Mississippi Agricultural and Forestry Experiment Station (MAFES) at MSU. After receiving his Ph.D in agricultural economics in 1988, Keenum joined the faculty as an assistant professor/economist in Mississippi State's Department of Agricultural Economics.
Keenum served on the staff of U.S. Senator Thad Cochran in Washington, D.C., from 1989–2006, first as a legislative assistant for agriculture and natural resources and then as chief of staff.

From 1997 to 2006, Keenum served Mississippi State as an adjunct professor in agricultural economics.

In 2006 Keenum was named the Under Secretary of Agriculture for Farm and Foreign Agricultural Services for the United States Department of Agriculture. In this role Keenum provided leadership and oversight for the Farm Service Agency, the Risk Management Agency, and the Foreign Agricultural Service.

Keenum was named as the 19th president of Mississippi State University in November 2008 and began his term in January 2009.

Keenum serves as chairman of the Southern Association of Colleges and Schools' Commission on Colleges' Executive Council.

He formerly served as a member of the Association of Public and Land-grant Universities board of directors.

Keenum was elected vice-president of the Southeastern Conference Executive Committee in 2015 and serves on the SEC’s Content Committee that oversees the SEC Network. He also represents the SEC as a member of the College Football Playoff's (CFP) Board of Managers. In 2016, he was elected to serve a two-year term as the president of the Southeastern Conference.

In 2018 Keenum was appointed as chair of the Board for International Food and Agricultural Development (BIFAD) by U.S. President Donald Trump.

Personal life
Keenum was born in Starkville, Mississippi, and grew up in Corinth, Mississippi. Keenum is married to the former Rhonda Newman of Booneville, Mississippi, also an MSU graduate. They have four children: Rett, Mary Phillips, Katie, and Torie.

Honors
 Mississippi Delta Council Farm Policy Commendation (1996)
 Second Harvest Distinguished Public Service Award (2008)
 Congressional Awards Program Leadership Award (2010)
 Mississippi Press Association Distinguished Mississippian (2011)
 Seaman A. Knapp Lecturer (2014)

References

External links
 Mark Keenum Biography at Mississippi State University

Mississippi State University alumni
People from Starkville, Mississippi
Living people
Presidents of Mississippi State University
Mississippi State University faculty
People from Corinth, Mississippi
1961 births